Lu Ming-che (born 4 December 1963) is a Taiwanese politician.

Education
Lu attended Taipei Municipal Jianguo High School, then studied business administration at National Chengchi University before pursuing a master's degree in the subject at Yuan Ze University.

Political career
Lu was elected to a single term on the Zhongli City Council, serving from 1998 to 2002. He was subsequently elected to the Taoyuan County Council for two full terms, serving until 2010. Later that year, Lu won the Zhongli mayoral election. He remained mayor until 2014, when Taoyuan County became a special municipality, and the city of Zhongli became a district of Taoyuan City. Lu then served on the Taoyuan City Council until 2020. In 2018, he sought the Kuomintang nomination as candidate for the mayoralty of Taoyuan. Following a party primary, the KMT selected Apollo Chen as its mayoral candidate. He was elected to the Legislative Yuan from Taoyuan City Constituency III in January 2020, succeeding Chen in office. During his first term as a member of the Legislative Yuan, Lu served on the transportation committee and took an interest in the review of CTi News performed by the National Communications Commission. Lu garnered some support for a Taoyuan mayoral bid prior to the 2022 Taiwanese local elections. However, the Kuomintang nominated Chang San-cheng in a closed-door meeting of its Central Standing Committee in May 2022.

References

1963 births
Living people
Kuomintang Members of the Legislative Yuan in Taiwan
New Party (Taiwan) politicians
People First Party (Taiwan) politicians
Members of the 10th Legislative Yuan
Mayors of places in Taiwan
National Chengchi University alumni
20th-century Taiwanese politicians
Taoyuan City Councilors
Politicians of the Republic of China on Taiwan from Taipei
Yuan Ze University alumni
Taoyuan City Members of the Legislative Yuan